The 1941–42 Cornell Big Red men's ice hockey season was the 35th season of play for the program. The teams was coached by Nick Bawlf in his 20th season.

Season
Cornell's season began with the 4th annual Lake Placid Invitational Tournament. The was fairly young, having six sophomores on the squad, but were still able to compete in the 8-team championship. Cornell dominated Middlebury in the first match but 2-time defending champion Colgate continued their undefeated tournament run with a 4-1 victory in the semifinal. Cornell's offense recovered in the third place match, firing 8 more goals into the net to defeat new entry New Hampshire to give themselves their best finish in three years. Stan Roberts led the team with 6 goals in the series.

After returning to campus, the team once again found themselves at the mercy of the weather. The conditions on Beebe Lake were poor but the Big Red soldiered on, trying to get as much practice in before their rematch with Colgate. Fortunately, the temperature dropped and the ice solidified enough for the first game to be played at Ithaca in two years. The home ice advantage allowed Cornell to build a 5-2 lead by the later half of the second period. However, after the Big Red found themselves playing 4 on 6, the Raiders scored twice to end the middle frame down by just one goal and then put up three more unanswered in the third to win the match.

Cornell would have to wait until after semester exams for their next game. By the time they were ready to go, the weather forced the cancellation of a match against Penn State on February 6. Cornell played a match in the middle of the following week against a weak Union squad and then headed to West Point for their final game of the season. The game turned into a barn-burner after Army led 2-1 after 20 minutes. Cornell evened the score early in the second and the game see-sawed between the two so that both teams had 4 on the board at the start of the third. From there on, Cornell was able to outpace the Cadets and win their 4th game of the season, giving the Big Red a winning record for the first time in eleven years.

Roster

Standings

Schedule and results

|-
!colspan=12 style=";"| 

|-
!colspan=12 style=";" | Regular Season

References

Cornell Big Red men's ice hockey seasons
Cornell
Cornell
Cornell
Cornell